Bjarne Brustad (4 March 1895, in Kristiania, now Oslo – 20 May 1978, in Oslo) was a Norwegian composer, violinist and violist. He played with symphonic orchestras in Stavanger and Oslo. In the 1920s he travelled to European cities such as Paris, Munich and Berlin, where he received musical inspiration and contacts. From 1928 to 1943, Brustad was viola soloist with Philharmonic Society Orchestra in Oslo. He wrote symphonies, compositions for violin and orchestra, chamber music and opera. His opera Atlantis was finished in 1945. After World War II he was also active in organizing work.

As a teacher at the Oslo Conservatory of Music, his students included Bjørn Fongaard and Trond Øyen.

Selected works
Stage
 Atlantis, Opera (1945)

Orchestral
 Suite No. 1 (1920)
 Berceuse and Waltz for chamber orchestra
 Perpetum Mobile for chamber orchestra (1924, revised 1958)
 Norsk Suite (Norwegian Suite) (1926, 1961); original version for viola and piano
 Concerto Grosso: En studie (1938)
 Symphony No. 1 (1948)
 Ouvertyre (Overture) (1950)
 Symphony No. 2 (1951)
 Suite No. 2 (1952)
 Symphony No. 3 (1953)
 Kinderspiele, Suite for chamber orchestra (1955)
 Cabaret for chamber orchestra (1958)
 Day-Dreams for chamber orchestra (1958)
 French Suite for chamber orchestra
 Suite (1959)
 Symphony No. 4 (1967)
 Symphony No. 5 (1967)
 Symphony No. 6 (1970)
 Symphony No. 7 (1972)
 Symphony No. 8 (1972)
 Symphony No. 9 (1973)

Concertante
 Concerto No. 1 for violin and orchestra (1922)
 Concerto No. 2 for violin and orchestra (1927)
 Concertino for viola and chamber orchestra (1932)
 Rapsodi (Rhapsody) for violin and orchestra, Op. 19 (1933)
 Concerto No. 3 for violin and orchestra; unfinished
 Vore jag et litet barn for violin and orchestra (1958)
 Concerto No. 4 for violin and orchestra (1961)
 Concerto for clarinet and string orchestra (1969)

Chamber music
 Berceuse for violin and piano
 Poeme for violin and piano
 Nature Morte, Parodie for string quartet (1926)
 Norsk Suite (Norwegian Suite) for viola and piano (1926); also for orchestra
 Capricci for violin and viola (1931)
 Partita for viola (1931, revised 1957)
 Eventyrsuite (Fairy Tale Suite) for violin (1932)
     Natur og hulder (Nature and Hulder)
     Veslefrikk
     Sull (Song)
     Trollkvenna (Troll's Mill)
 Sonata No. 1 for violin (1935, revised 1958)
 Trio [No. 1] for clarinet, violin and viola (1938)
 Fanitullsuite (Devil Suite) for violin (1946)
     Hildring
     Huldrespill
     Likferd
     Fanitul
 Serenade, Trio No. 2 for violin, clarinet and bassoon (1947)
 Sonata for violin and piano (1950)
 Sonata No. 2 for violin (1956)
 Sonata No. 3 for violin (1957)
 Divertimento for flute (1958)
 String Quartet No. 3 (1959)
 Serenade for flute, oboe, clarinet, horn and bassoon (1969)

Piano
 Fra barnets verden (From a Child's World; Kinderspiele) (1934)
 Pièce héroique

Vocal
 Hugen for voice and piano (1912); words by Ivar Aasen
 Bånsull fra Sunndalen (Lullaby from Sunndalen) for voice and piano (1921)
 Et barn (A Child) for voice and piano (1948); words by Arnulf Øverland
 Berceuse for soprano and orchestra
 Did You Cry...? for voice and string orchestra; words by Ingeborg Boyine Flood (1901–1963)
 Stærvise for soprano or tenor and piano

References

External links
 Biography at Music Information Centre Norway

1895 births
1978 deaths
Composers for violin
Musicians from Oslo
Norwegian classical composers
Norwegian classical violinists
Male classical violinists
Norwegian classical violists
Norwegian opera composers
20th-century classical composers
Norwegian male classical composers
20th-century classical violinists
Academic staff of the Oslo Conservatory of Music
20th-century Norwegian male musicians
20th-century violists